Lucas Parodi (born 30 November 1990) is an Argentine football midfielder who plays for Temperley.

External links
 GOAL statistics
 BDFA profile

1990 births
Living people
Argentine footballers
Argentine expatriate footballers
Association football defenders
Club Atlético Belgrano footballers
Cobresal footballers
Chilean Primera División players
Argentine Primera División players
Expatriate footballers in Chile